Butebo District is a district in the Eastern Region of Uganda. Like most other Ugandan districts, it is named after its chief town, Butebo, where the district headquarters are located.

Location
Butebo District is bordered to the north by (from west to east) Ngora District, Kumi District and Bukedea District. Mbale District lies to the east, Budaka District lies to the south and Pallisa District lies to the west.

Overview
Following requests for district status by the residents, President Yoweri Museveni, in 2010, instructed his Minister of Local Government at the time, Adolf Mwesige, table a law in the Ugandan parliament to that effect. The law was tabled in parliament in August 2015, with the district to become operational on 1 July 2017. Prior to then the district was "Butebo County" in Pallisa District.

Population
In 2008, the population of Butebo District was estimated at 120,000 people.

Notable people
Stephen Mallinga (17 November 1943 to 11 April 2013), medical doctor and politician. Formerly Minister of Disaster Preparedness and Refugees (2011–2013) and former Minister of Health (2006 until 2011). Former MP, representing Butebo County.
Patrick Mutono (17 March 1960), medical doctor and politician. Current MP, representing Butebo County.

See also
Districts of Uganda
Regions of Uganda

References

External links
  New Butebo district has one vehicle
Website of the Parliament of Uganda

 
Districts of Uganda
Eastern Region, Uganda